Ganesh Temple may refer to many Hindu temples dedicated to the god Ganesha (or Ganesh):

Ganesha Temple, Idagunji
Garh Ganesh Temple, in Jaipur
Hindu Temple Society of North America, in New York City, built around a Ganesh Temple
Khajrana Ganesh Temple, in Indore
Morgaon Ganesha Temple

See also
List of Ganapati temples, a longer list of temples dedicated to Ganesha